Michel Cournot (1 May 1922 – 8 February 2007) was a French journalist, screenwriter and film director. As a writer he was awarded the Fénéon Prize in 1949 for Martinique. His only film as a director, Les Gauloises bleues, was due to be entered at the 1968 Cannes Film Festival, but the festival was cancelled because of the events of May 1968 in France.

He received a Genie Award nomination for Best Original Screenplay at the 10th Genie Awards in 1989, as cowriter with Claude Fournier and Marie-José Raymond of the Canadian television miniseries The Mills of Power (Les Tisserands du pouvoir).

Selected filmography
 Les Gauloises bleues (1968)

References

External links

1922 births
2007 deaths
Writers from Paris
Lycée Louis-le-Grand alumni
French film directors
French film critics
French male screenwriters
20th-century French screenwriters
20th-century French journalists
Deaths from cancer in France
Prix des Deux Magots winners
French male non-fiction writers
Prix Fénéon winners
20th-century French male writers